Showdown at the Cotton Mill (Chinese title: 胡惠乾血戰西幝寺; Mandarin: Hu Hui Chien xie zhan xi chan si), also released as Cold Face, Heart and Blood, is a 1978 Hong Kong martial arts action film directed by Wu Ma. The film was believed to be lost until Rarescope uncovered the film in a Taiwanese film vault. It is a sequel to the 1976 film The Shaolin Avengers, which was co-directed by Wu Ma and Chang Cheh and stars Kuan-Chun Chi as Hu Hui-Chien.

Plot
After achieving much fame and glory from smashing the cotton mill, Shaolin hero Hu Hui-Chien has become the people's champion and the sworn enemy of the Ching government. So enraged are they that they employ the best fighters from the Wu Tang. A master leg fighter named Kao Chin Chung, whose "Flash Northern Legs" are undefeated in the whole of China, travels to Canton at the invitation of the Ching government to kill Shaolin master Hu Hui-Chien. This leads to the classic northern kicks and southern fist duel. The climax has Kao Chin being defeated and killed by Hu Hui Chien but Hu Hui Chien also dies from the kick wounds to end the movie.

Cast
 Kuan-Chun Chi as Hu Hui-Chien
 Tao-liang Tan as Master Kao Chin Chung
 Peng Chang as Uy Hsing-Hung
 Ching Kuo Chung as Tung Chien-Chin
 Wan Fei
 Keung Li
 Mao Shan

External links
 
 

1978 films
1970s Mandarin-language films
Hong Kong martial arts films
Taiwanese martial arts films
Kung fu films
Films directed by Wu Ma
Cotton production
1970s rediscovered films
1970s action drama films
1970s Hong Kong films